Derrycrag Wood Nature Reserve is a national nature reserve and Special Area of Conservation of approximately  located near Woodford, County Galway, Ireland. It is managed by the Irish National Parks & Wildlife Service.

Features
Derrycrag Wood Nature Reserve was legally protected as a national nature reserve by the Irish government in 1983. It is also a Special Area of Conservation for its old sessile oak woodland.

Derrycrag Wood, with Pollnaknockaun and Rosturra Wood, represent fragments of the previously extensive oak and ash forests which dominated the local landscape for hundreds of years. There is also an under planting of hazel, holly, and other woodland flora. Animals including red squirrels, foxes, badgers, pine martens, bats, sparrowhawks, jays, and kestrels live on the reserve. The rare shrub, bird cherry, grows in the wood along the banks of the Woodford River. There are two trails within the reserve.

References

Geography of County Galway
Forests and woodlands of the Republic of Ireland
Nature reserves in the Republic of Ireland
Tourist attractions in County Galway
Special Areas of Conservation in the Republic of Ireland